Rodolfo Hoyos Jr. (March 14, 1916 – April 15, 1983) was a Mexican-American film and television actor. He was known for playing the role of "Rafael Rosillo" in the 1956 film The Brave One. Hoyos died in April 1983 from a stroke in Los Angeles, California, at the age of 67.

Partial filmography 

Masquerade in Mexico (1945) - Bullfight Spectator (uncredited)
Gilda (1946) - Peasant (uncredited)
Perilous Holiday (1946) - Castone (uncredited)
Honeymoon (1947) - Flanner's Friend (uncredited)
We Were Strangers (1949) - (uncredited)
The Big Steal (1949) - Customs Inspector (uncredited)
The Capture (1950) - Baggage Agent (uncredited)
Crisis - Chauffeur (uncredited)
A Lady Without Passport (1950) - Policeman (uncredited)
Raton Pass (1951) - Ben
Smuggler's Island (1951) - Sikh Policeman (uncredited)
The Magic Carpet (1951) - Sergeant (uncredited)
The Fighter (1952) - Alvarado
Second Chance (1953) - Vasco
Wings of the Hawk (1953) - Clerk (uncredited)
Jubilee Trail (1954) - Spaniard (uncredited)
Gypsy Colt (1954) - Rodolfo
Secret of the Incas (1954) - (uncredited)
Green Fire (1954) - Pedro, the Bartender (uncredited)
The Americano (1955) - Cristino

The Fighting Chance (1955) - Rico
Time Table (1956) - Lt. Castro
The Three Outlaws (1956) - El Gallo
Secret of Treasure Mountain (1956) - Francisco Martinez
The First Texan (1956) - Col. Cos
The Brave One (1956) - Rafael Rosillo
Stagecoach to Fury (1956) - Lorenzo Gracia
Duel at Apache Wells (1957) - Jose Galindo (uncredited)
Ghost Diver (1957) - Papa Rico - the Diver
Gun Battle at Monterey (1957) - Posseman (uncredited)
The Toughest Gun in Tombstone (1958) - Col. Emillo
Crash Landing (1958) - Carlos Ortega (uncredited)
Villa!! (1958) - Pancho Villa
Ten Days to Tulara (1958) - Cesar
The Little Savage (1959) - Captain Taursus
The Miracle (1959) - Cafe Manager (uncredited)
Operation Eichmann (1961) - Sanchez (uncredited)

California (1963) - Padre Soler
The Gun Hawk (1963) - Miguel
A Global Affair (1964) - Spanish Delegate (uncredited)
Seven Days in May (1964) - Captain Ortega (uncredited)
Madame X (1966) - Patrone (uncredited)
Ed Dorado (1966) - Bit Part (uncredited)
Return of the Gunfighter (1966) - Luis Domingo
Rango (1967 TV series) - Gomez (Episode: "In a Little Mexican Town")
Change of Habit (1969) - Mr. Hernandez
That Girl (1970) season 5 episode 12 "That Señorita" as Rudy Sanchez
Moonfire (1970) - Pedro
The Resurrection of Zachary Wheeler (1971) - Medina
Viva Valdez (1976 TV series) - Luis Valdez (12 episodes)
Love & Money (1981) - Gen. Sanzer

References

External links 

Rotten Tomatoes profile

1916 births
1983 deaths
People from Mexico City
Male actors from Mexico City
Mexican emigrants to the United States
American male film actors
American male television actors
Mexican male film actors
Mexican male television actors
20th-century American male actors
20th-century Mexican male actors
Western (genre) television actors
Male Western (genre) film actors
Los Angeles Dodgers announcers